Morum bruuni is a species of sea snail, a marine gastropod mollusk in the family Harpidae, the harp snails.

Description

Distribution
This marine species is endemic to New Zealand

References

  Lee, H.G. The Genus Morum Worldwide.

Harpidae
Gastropods of New Zealand